Bryan Place is a neighborhood in Old East Dallas, Texas (USA).  It is east of the Arts District of downtown and the State Thomas neighborhood, north of Deep Ellum, south of Cityplace and west of Munger Place.  Its boundaries are generally considered to be US-75 North Central Expressway on the west, Ross Avenue on the (north)west, N. Washington Street on the (north)east, and Live Oak Avenue on the (south)east.

History 
The neighborhood is named for John Neely Bryan, the founder of Dallas.  The current structures in the neighborhood were built in the 1980s by developer Fox and Jacobs.

Parks 
The major outdoor community space is Exall Park, located on the south edge of the neighborhood next to Live Oak Street.

Community facilities
The Exall Park Recreation Center is located in Exall Park.  The Bryan Place Swimming Pool Association operates a members-only outdoor swimming pool and a meeting room which is available to the community.  Adjacent to Bryan Place is the Latino Cultural Center which has an auditorium for larger presentations and meetings.

Architecture 

Bryan place contains an eclectic blend of architecture, old and new, large and small, residential and commercial.  Older buildings include commercial buildings and houses from the first half of the 20th century, including the Macedonia Baptist Church and 1935 Dallas ISD Headquarters.  Lots sizes are small, with many houses built to "zero lot line" setback on at least one side.  Later developments have tended to be multi-family townhouses, low-rise condominiums and apartment buildings since the 1980s, and many single-family homes from the 1980s onwards.  

Nearby and visible from much of the neighborhood are Baylor University Medical Center to the south and the former Southwestern Bell tower to the east.

Transportation

Highways 
  North Central Expressway (US 75)

Trains 
 DART 
 Deep Ellum Station (in adjacent neighborhood: Deep Ellum)
 DART  and 
 Cityplace Station (in adjacent neighborhood: Cityplace)

Education 
Bryan Place is served by the Dallas Independent School District.  Residents of Bryan Place are zoned to J.W. Ray Elementary School, Alex W. Spence Middle School and North Dallas High School.
Holy Trinity Catholic School, a private school, located approximately 2 miles northwest of Bryan Place in the Oak Lawn neighborhood, provides education for three-year-olds through eighth grade.

References

External links 
Bryan Place Homeowner's Association

Neighborhoods in Old East Dallas